Hôpital Maisonneuve-Rosemont is a hospital in Montreal, Quebec, Canada, located in the boroughs of Rosemont–La Petite-Patrie and Mercier-Hochelaga-Maisonneuve. It serves the eastern part of the city and offers 800 beds. It employs 5,000 people and 3,000 students annually.

History

Hôpital Maisonneuve-Rosemont was founded in 1971 as a result of a merger of two previous hospitals: Hôpital Maisonneuve and Hôpital Saint-Joseph de Rosemont.

Hôpital Maisonneuve was founded by the Grey Nuns in 1954 and housed a nursing school and the Montreal Heart Institute. Hôpital Saint-Joseph de Rosemont was founded in 1950 by the Misericordia Sisters. It specialized in treating tuberculosis.

Specialization
Hôpital Maisonneuve-Rosemont offers general medical care, but it is known for specializing in a few particular areas: ophthalmology, stem cell treatments of various cancers, and nephrology.

References

Bibliography
 Denis Goulet, L'hôpital Maisonneuve-Rosemont, une histoire médicale, 1954-2004, Septentrion, 2004.

External links
Hôpital Maisonneuve-Rosemont 

Hospitals in Montreal
Teaching hospitals in Canada
Hospitals established in 1971
1971 establishments in Quebec
Rosemont–La Petite-Patrie
Mercier–Hochelaga-Maisonneuve
Université de Montréal